Dominica is an overwhelmingly Christian majority country, with adherents of Islam being a minuscule minority. Due to secular nature of the Dominica's constitution, Muslims are free to proselytize and build places of worship in the country. 

Statistics for Islam in Dominica are not readily available. According to the International Religious Freedom Report in 2005, followers of minority religions and denominations, which range in number from 1.6 percent to 0.2 percent of the population, include Rastafarians, Jehovah's Witnesses, Anglicans, and Muslims. The Muslim community, which consists mostly of foreign students at Ross University School of Medicine, financed the 2004 construction of the Al Ansaar Mosque in Portsmouth. The islands known Islamic organizations include the Muslim Community of Dominica in Roseau and the Association of Muslim Students at Ross.

External links
 Muslim Community of Dominica